The IPCC supplementary report of 1992 was published to contribute to the debate on the United Nations Framework Convention on Climate Change at the 1992 Earth Summit, held in Rio de Janeiro.

The report updated and revised some of the data contained in the IPCC First Assessment Report, and included six new climate change scenarios, including an update of the 1990 reference scenario.

The major conclusion was that research since 1990 did "not affect our fundamental understanding of the science of the greenhouse effect and either confirm or do not justify alteration of the major conclusions of the first IPCC scientific assessment". It noted that transient (time-dependent) simulations, which had been very preliminary in the FAR, were now improved, but did not include aerosol or ozone changes.

See also 

 Avoiding Dangerous Climate Change – international conference (2005)
 Individual and political action on climate change
 Business action on climate change
 Energy policy
 Energy conservation
 Global climate model
 Precautionary principle
 World energy resources and consumption

Further reading 
Climate Change 1992: The IPCC Supplementary Report; editors: J.T. Houghton, B.A. Callander and S.K. Varney; Cambridge University Press; 1992 
 IPCC Publications / Reports: 1992 Supplementary Reports  (subpages with links to PDFs of sections):
The Supplementary Report to The IPCC Scientific Assessment 
The Supplementary Report to The IPCC Impacts Assessment 
The IPCC 1990 and 1992 Assessments

References

Climate change assessment and attribution
Environmental reports
1992 in the environment